Rodney W. Sippel (born July 26, 1956) is a Senior United States district judge of the United States District Court for the Eastern District of Missouri and a United States district judge of the United States District Court for the Western District of Missouri.

Education and career

Sippel was born in Jefferson City, Missouri. He received a Bachelor of Science degree from University of Tulsa in 1978, and a Juris Doctor from Washington University School of Law in 1981. He lived in St. Louis, Missouri and practiced law there, except for a period when he was an administrative assistant to United States Representative Richard A. Gephardt from 1993 to 1995.

Federal judicial service

On May 15, 1997, Sippel was nominated by President Bill Clinton to serve as a United States district judge of the United States District Courts for both the Western and Eastern District of Missouri, to a seat vacated by Stephen N. Limbaugh Sr. He was confirmed by the United States Senate on November 8, 1997, and received his commission on November 12, 1997. He assumed senior status on January 28, 2023. He served as chief judge of the United States District Court for the Eastern District of Missouri from January 4, 2016 to December 16, 2022. In spite of his joint appointment, Sippel maintains chambers and hears cases only in the Eastern District of Missouri.

References

Sources

1956 births
Living people
Judges of the United States District Court for the Western District of Missouri
Judges of the United States District Court for the Eastern District of Missouri
People from Jefferson City, Missouri
United States district court judges appointed by Bill Clinton
University of Tulsa alumni
Washington University School of Law alumni
20th-century American judges
21st-century American judges